Tekla Batková (1764–1852) was a Czech singer. She was engaged as the official singer of the court of the Duchy of Courland from 1782 to 1795. She also made several successful tours throughout Europe before, during, and after her tenure as court singer.

References 

 Starší divadlo v českých zemích do konce 18. století. Osobnosti a díla, ed. A. Jakubcová, Praha: Divadelní ústav – Academia 2007
 http://encyklopedie.idu.cz/index.php/Batkov%C3%A1,_Tekla

1764 births
1852 deaths
18th-century Bohemian singers
People from the Duchy of Courland and Semigallia